Binscarth is an unincorporated urban community in the Municipality of Russell – Binscarth, Manitoba.

Prior to 1 January 2015, it was designated as a village.

The economic base of Binscarth and area is a mix of agriculture and service businesses. Major industrial employers in the area include three potash mines nearby in Saskatchewan (Nutrien in Rocanville, and Mosaic K1 in Esterhazy and K2 in Gerald) and a canola crushing plant (Bunge) at Harrowby Manitoba.

Current NHL player Cody McLeod was born in Binscarth.

History 
The community was originally formed around a stock farm established by the Scottish Ontario and Manitoba Land Company some three miles northwest of the current townsite. It was named after the Company founder's ancestral home in the Orkney islands. When the Manitoba and Northwestern Railway (later CPR) was built through the area in 1886, the railway station was established at the current site of SE15-19-28W, and the community soon relocated itself there, incorporating as a village in 1917.

In 2015, Binscarth amalgamated with the town of Russell and the Rural Municipality of Russell to form the Municipality of Russell-Binscarth.

Seekaywye 
In 1964, Binscarth residents narrowly defeated (by ten votes) a proposal to rename itself Seekaywye, after the Winnipeg radio station CKY. If successful, the station would have promoted Binscarth/Seekaywye as a vacation resort. CKY also offered the same deal to La Riviere, Manitoba, who also said no.

For many years, the radio frequency of CKY 580 was remembered in local business names the 580 Hotel and 580 Plumbing and Heating.

Demographics 

Attractions 
The Binscarth & District Gordon Orr Memorial Museum has a large collection of Native artifacts. The museum is also one of only a handful of museums to exhibit an extinct bison skull. Also on display is a Massey-Harris tractor, a binder, a seed drill, and a 6-horsepower International Engine dating from 1905. There is also a general store, summer kitchen, chapel, and school room. The museum is open in July and August.

Binscarth is home to the "largest outdoor swimming pool on the Yellowhead highway." The pool, park and campground are located just south of the community in the Silver Creek valley.

Climate

References 

Billboard magazine, June 6, 1964, page 14 "CKY given a No vote"*

External links 
 Binscarth Homepage

Designated places in Manitoba
Unincorporated communities in Parkland Region, Manitoba
Unincorporated urban communities in Manitoba
Former villages in Manitoba
Populated places disestablished in 2015